Amy Anderson (born September 1, 1972) is an American comedian, actor, and writer. 
A classically-trained musician, she has been singing and playing the piano and guitar for many years, earning her bachelor's degree in Music Education from Westminster Choir College. Upon completing college her career took a different direction, with Anderson working in a variety of positions – including supervising a coffee shop, working with adults with autism, and owning a pet care business. Eventually she chose to move into comedy and acting, and performed in the Fresh Ink series at Illusion Theater and other places. She currently resides in Southern California, where she is a working actor and comedian.

Many of Anderson's jokes deal with motherhood, racism, and being adopted. She produced the monthly "ChopSchtick Comedy" show at the Hollywood Laugh Factory and the Hollywood Improv, the first ever all-Asian American stand-up comedy showcase in the US.

Personal life
She was born in Seoul, South Korea and adopted, as an infant, by American parents and raised in suburban Minnesota.

Anderson is the mother of child actor Aubrey Anderson-Emmons, who played Lily Tucker-Pritchett on ABC's Modern Family. Amy has a YouTube channel with daughter Aubrey called FoodManiaReview.

Filmography

References

External links

 

1972 births
Living people
American adoptees
American stand-up comedians
American women comedians
American writers of Korean descent
American women bloggers
American bloggers
Actresses from Minnesota
American actresses of Korean descent
Westminster Choir College alumni
Comedians from Minnesota
21st-century American comedians
Writers from Minnesota
20th-century American women writers
21st-century American women writers
20th-century American comedians
20th-century American actresses
21st-century American actresses
American comedians of Asian descent